The International University of Management and Administration is a management-education university in Cotonou, Benin. It is recognized by NUC.

The university's vision is to promote young managers by giving them quality training based on official curricula of the leading careers. It gives aims at giving a high-level training to young high school diploma holders.

History 
The university was founded in 2010.

Courses 
The university's accredited courses include:

 Pharmacy
 Accounting
 Business administration
 Hotel and tourism management
 Architecture
 Human biology, nutrition and nursing
 Hospital management
 Computer engineering
 Computer science
 Management information system
 Economics
 Banking and finance
 Marketing
 Political science
 Law
 International relations and European studies
 Finance management
 Mass communication
 French language and linguistics
 Psychology

See also

 Education in Benin
 List of universities in Benin

References

External links
 , the university's official website

Buildings and structures in Cotonou
Education in Cotonou
Business schools in Africa
Universities in Benin

2010 establishments in Benin
Educational institutions established in 2010